Gennadi Georgievich Volnov (November 28, 1939 – July 15, 2008) was a Russian basketball player who played for the senior Soviet Union national basketball team from the late 1950s, to the early 1970s. He was born in Moscow. He was among the 105 player nominees for the 50 Greatest EuroLeague Contributors list.

Club career
Volnov played with Spartak Moscow (1957–1958). He spent most of his club career playing with CSKA Moscow (1958–1970). While playing with CSKA and the Russian and Moscow unified teams, he won 10 Soviet League championships (1959, 1960, 1961, 1962, 1963, 1964, 1965, 1966, 1969, and 1970) and 3 EuroLeague championships (1961, 1963, and 1969).

Soviet national team
Volnov won the gold medal while playing with the senior Soviet Union national basketball team at the 1972 Summer Olympic Games. He also won two silver medals at the Summer Olympics (1960 and 1964). He also won a bronze medal at the 1968 Summer Olympic Games.

In addition, Volnov also won a gold medal at the 1967 FIBA World Championship, a bronze medal at the 1963 FIBA World Championship, and six EuroBasket gold medals (1959, 1961, 1963, 1965, 1967, and 1969).

External links
 

1939 births
2008 deaths
Basketball players at the 1960 Summer Olympics
Basketball players at the 1964 Summer Olympics
Basketball players at the 1968 Summer Olympics
Basketball players at the 1972 Summer Olympics
BC Dynamo Moscow players
Centers (basketball)
FIBA EuroBasket-winning players
Medalists at the 1960 Summer Olympics
Medalists at the 1964 Summer Olympics
Medalists at the 1968 Summer Olympics
Medalists at the 1972 Summer Olympics
Olympic basketball players of the Soviet Union
Olympic bronze medalists for the Soviet Union
Olympic gold medalists for the Soviet Union
Olympic medalists in basketball
Olympic silver medalists for the Soviet Union
PBC CSKA Moscow players
Power forwards (basketball)
Russian men's basketball players
FIBA World Championship-winning players
1967 FIBA World Championship players
Soviet men's basketball players
1963 FIBA World Championship players